Jonas Toboll (born 10 June 1987) is a German former footballer who played as a goalkeeper.

Career
Toboll made his professional debut for Kickers Emden in the 3. Liga on 13 May 2009, starting in the home match against VfB Stuttgart II, which finished as a 2–1 win.

References

External links
 
 

1987 births
Living people
Footballers from Hamburg
German footballers
Association football goalkeepers
Rotenburger SV players
Kickers Emden players
SV Drochtersen/Assel players
FC Oberneuland players
VfB Lübeck players
3. Liga players
Regionalliga players